Antonio Oppes (26 August 1916 in Pozzomaggiore – 8 June 2002 in Rome) was an Italian show jumping rider who won a bronze medal at the Olympic Games.

Biography
In his career he participated in one edition of the Summer Olympics, is the younger brother of Salvatore Oppes (1909–1987).

Achievements

References

External links
 
 
 

1916 births
2002 deaths
Italian show jumping riders
Olympic equestrians of Italy
Italian male equestrians
Olympic bronze medalists for Italy
Equestrians at the 1960 Summer Olympics
Equestrians of Centro Sportivo Carabinieri
Medalists at the 1960 Summer Olympics